This is a list of American football players who have played for the Washington Senators (NFL) of the National Football League in 1921. It includes players that have played at least one match with the team.



A
Dan Ahern, 
Alec Anderson

B
George Beyers,
Johnny Bleier, 
Benny Boynton

C
Pete Calac,
Joe Coster,
Harry Courtney, 
Billy Crouch

D
Perry Dowrick

G
Larry Gardner, 
Patsy Gerardi, 
Johnny Gilroy,
Tom Gormley, 
Joe Guyon

H
Johnnie Hudson

K
Sam Kaplan

L
Dutch Leighty,
Red Litkus, 
Mickey Livers

M
Don McCarthy, 
Cy McDonald

P
Gordon Patterson

S
Metz Smeach, Jack Sullivan

T
Buff Turner, 
Sam Turner

U
Pong Unitas

V
Ed Van Meter,
Gene Vidal

W
Bullets Walson

References
List of 1921 Washington Senators NFL players

 
Washington Sen